Meland is a village in Alver municipality in Vestland county, Norway. Meland Church is located here, serving the whole municipality.

References

Villages in Vestland
Alver (municipality)